Phloen Phromdaen, or birthname Somsuan Promsawang is a Luk thung and speak story singer, and a 2012 winner of National Artist from Thailand award.

He was born on June 12th 1939 in Sa Kaeo Province. His parents are Pluem and Tun Promsawang. He had five cousins. He has been actively performing since the 1970's. He was notable in the psychedelic music area.

Discography
 Samak Duan (สมัครด่วน)
 Khao Soad Soad (ข่าวสดๆ)
 Phoo Taen Ma Lew (ผู้แทนมาแล้ว)
 Lung Dee Khee Maw (ลุงดีขี้เมา)
 Aa Tee Sak Mang Korn (อาตี๋สักมังกร)
 Pao Pun Jin Phao San (เปาบุ้นจิ้นเผาศาล)
 Chom Rom Lek Ded (ชมรมเลขเด็ด)

References

1939 births
Living people
Phloen Phromdaen
Phloen Phromdaen
Phloen Phromdaen
Phloen Phromdaen
Phloen Phromdaen